Pirates of Tortuga is a 1961 DeLuxe Color American swashbuckler film which invented an alternate history for the actual Welsh privateer Henry Morgan. It was released in October 1961 in the United States in CinemaScope.

Plot
In the 17th century, a Welsh captain (Ken Scott) and his crew are dispatched to the Spanish-controlled island of Tortuga, where famed privateer Henry Morgan (Robert Stephens) has defected from his support of the English empire and is running a strictly piratical venture, stopping any and all vessels, including British carriers. Since the captain cannot attack the island without incurring the wrath of the Spanish government, he must go one-on-one with Morgan himself.

A comely female (Leticia Roman) inadvertently stows away on the captain's vessel and becomes the de facto central focus of the story (Morgan doesn't appear until the latter half of the film). She is initially deposited on the nearby island of Jamaica, where she makes a halfhearted play for the colonial governor, but eventually readjusts her sights on the captain himself. In the meantime, the captain fully engages in pursuing the pirate Morgan.

Cast

Production
The film was made by Sam Katzman's unit at 20th Century Fox. Their first film had been The Wizard of Baghdad. He did this under a verbal agreement with Buddy Adler then in September 1960 Robert Goldstein signed him to a three-picture contract. These were to be Gentlemen Pirates written by Mel Levy, a film about Mississippi gamblers written by Jesse Lasky Jr. and Pat Silver, and Cypress Gardens by Lou Morheim. In the end he wound up making only one movie at Fox, Pirates of Tortuga (1961).

Robert Webb signed to direct in December 1960. The same month, singer Dave King was signed to play a support role. Robert Stephens was then also under contract to Fox and was put in the cast. So too was Rafer Johnson. It was the first lead for Ken Scott who had been under contract to Fox for five years.

Filming started 11 January 1961. The film was shot entirely on the Fox backlot in Los Angeles, using the water tank that had been created for the TV series Adventures in Paradise. Johnson later recalled filming scenes of steering the boat "as a lot of fun, as were the scenes of fencing and hand to hand combat."

Reception
The Los Angeles Times called the film "pure costume".

References

External links
 
 Pirates of Tortuga at TCMDB
 
Pirates of Tortuga at BFI
 
 Pirates of Torutga at British Film Institute

1961 films
20th Century Fox films
Pirate films
CinemaScope films
Films set in Haiti
Films directed by Robert D. Webb
Films set in the 17th century
Cultural depictions of Henry Morgan
1960s historical films
American historical films
Films scored by Paul Sawtell
1960s English-language films
1960s American films